This is a list of educational institutes in the city of Ahmedabad, India. Most of the colleges in Ahmedabad are affiliated to the Gujarat University and are spread throughout the city as well as the suburbs. The schools are governed by the Gujarat Secondary and Higher Secondary Education Board.

Engineering colleges
 L.J. Institute of Engineering & Technology
 Lalbhai Dalpatbhai College of Engineering
 Nirma University of Science and Technology
Vishwakarma Government Engineering College
Ahmedabad Institute of Technology 
Ahmedabad University-School of Engineering & Applied Science
SAL engineering and technical institute
 School of Engineering and Applied Science

Journalism Institute
Times Business School, Best Journalism College at Ahmedabad
 National Institute of Mass Communication and Journalism - NIMCJ

Management Institutes
 Ahmedabad Management Association
 B. K. Majumdar Institute of Business Management now Ahmedabad University
 B.K. School of Business Management
 Indian Institute of Management Ahmedabad
 Nirma University of Science and Technology
 LJ Institute of Business Administration
Adani Institute of Infrastructure Management
 MICA (Institute of Strategic Marketing and Communication)

Medical colleges
 B.J. Medical College
 Public Health Foundation of India
AMC Dental College
 Smt. NHL Municipal Medical College

Pharmacy colleges
 L. M. College of Pharmacy
 Institute of Pharmacy, Nirma University
 L.J. Institute of Pharmacy

Science colleges
 Gujarat College
 St. Xavier's College, Ahmedabad

High schools
 Shanti Asiatic school
 Shree Sardar Patel & Swami Vivekanand School
 A. G. High School
 Ahmedabad International School
 Calorx Olive International School
 Calorx Public School, Ghatlodia
 Best High School
 Brighton school, Danilimda
Brighton Public school, Juhapura
 Diwan-Ballubhai School
 Delhi Public School, Bopal
 Delhi Public School, East
Kendriya Vidyalaya Shahibaugh
Kendriya Vidyalaya Army Cantonment, Ahmedabad
Kendriya Vidyalaya ONGC Ahmedabad
Kendriya Vidyalaya Sabarmati, Ahmedabad
Kendriya Vidyalaya SAC Ahmedabad
 Mahatma Gandhi International School
 Maharaja Agrasen Vidyalaya
 Seventh Day Adventist Higher Secondary School
 Sheth C. N. Vidyalaya
 St. Xavier's High School
 St. Xavier's High School Loyola Hall
 The Riverside School, Ahmedabad
 Udgam School for Children

See also
 Ahmedabad Education Society

References

 
Ahmedabad
Ahmedabad
Ahmedabad-related lists